Ionuț Adrian Puțanu (born 9 January 1994 in Romania) is a Romanian footballer who plays as a centre back for German club 1.FC Alemannia Hamberg.

References

External links
 Profile at official club website
 

1994 births
Living people
Sportspeople from Galați
Romanian footballers
Association football defenders
Liga I players
Liga II players
FC Viitorul Constanța players
FC Brașov (1936) players
CSM Reșița players
ASC Oțelul Galați players
Romanian expatriate footballers
Romanian expatriate sportspeople in Germany
Expatriate footballers in Germany